The Save Cup was a tournament for professional female tennis players played on outdoor clay courts. The event was classified as a $50,000 ITF Women's Circuit tournament and was held in Mestre, Italy, from 2003 to 2013.

Past finals

Singles

Doubles

External links 
  
 ITF search

 
ITF Women's World Tennis Tour
Clay court tennis tournaments
Tennis tournaments in Italy
Sport in Venice
2003 establishments in Italy
Recurring sporting events established in 2003
Recurring sporting events disestablished in 2013
Defunct tennis tournaments in Italy